Jelenska Reber is a settlement northwest of Dole pri Litiji in the Municipality of Litija in central Slovenia. The area is part of the traditional region of Lower Carniola. It is now included with the rest of the municipality in the Central Sava Statistical Region; until January 2014 the municipality was part of the Central Slovenia Statistical Region.

History
Jelenska Reber was a hamlet of Dole pri Litiji until 1995, when it became a separate settlement.

References

External links
Jelenska Reber on Geopedia

Populated places in the Municipality of Litija